Alfonsas Danys (16 September 1924 – 2014) was a Lithuanian writer known for satire works, detective fiction and novels about a rural life, Interwar, World War II and the Soviet Lithuania.

Early life and education
Danys was born to a Lithuanian family of farmers in 1924 in Trumpiškiai, Rokiškis, Lithuania. He was raised in a family of five children: he had one brother and three sisters. In 1937, due to a fire, his parents lost all the buildings and animals on the farm.

Danys studied at Rokiškis gymnasium. His first employment was a teacher’s job at Pakriauniai elementary school where he worked for 2 years since 1944 autumn. In 1946, he moved to Kaunas to study at the Lithuanian University of Health Sciences. In 1947, he moved to Vilnius to study law. In Vilnius, he held a variety of jobs including work at the confectionery factory "Žibutė" where he began writing. Danys finished Lithuanian language and literature studies at the Vilnius Pedagogical Institute. His longest employment started in 1953 at the Lithuanian government body where he worked for 33 years. Danys has begun his career as an assistant editor of government news at the Lithuanian branch of the Supreme Soviet of the Soviet Union. Later he worked as a chief editor and translator at the Presidium of the Supreme Soviet. As a specialist in Lithuanian language philology, Danys was responsible for translating legal documents from Russian to Lithuanian.

Writing career 
Danys wrote his first book ("Saldaus Gyvenimo Klampynėse") after a work experience at the confectionery factory. The theme of the book was the impact of communism on human mentality and how thefts became a norm in society.
Danys started to write satires and feuilletons when he worked at the Supreme Soviet of the Soviet Union. He wrote under a pseudonym "Banys". Since 1961, satires were published by Šluota and other magazines. 250 of works were published since then.
In 1982, "Pergalė" magazine has published parts of a satire novel "Rūkytas Kumpis" where Danys wrote about the Soviet government in a humorous tone. This event has prevented to publish more of Danys works during the Soviet Lithuania.
All Danys works were published only after 1990 when Lithuania got the independence from the Soviet Union. The first book was published when he was 54 years old.

Works
The most popular works of Alfonsas Danys are the series of four novels that talk about the Interwar, World War II and Postwar periods. The books were inspired by a resistance among intellectuals and artists to adapt their ideas to the ideology of the communism during the Soviet occupation. In Soviet Lithuania, only the works which were adapted to fit the view of the Soviet ideology were allowed to be published. All artists, including writers, scriptwriters and cinema directors were forced to adapt the original stories with the demands of the Soviets. Danys was also asked to include the Soviet ideas to a movie script "Kruvina Puota" ("Blood Feast") that he wrote, although a writer refused to follow a demand of the Soviet censorship and he burned a script instead. This event inspired Danys to write the series of four novels connected by the same characters.

The Four Novel Series
The series is an analysis of a certain type of people who lived during the Interwar, World War II and Postwar periods. The series theme is a divide between rural people who supported different ideologies during the World War - Nazis, Soviets or Lithuanian Forest Brothers. The second theme is the agriculture reform called the collectivization of agriculture during which all private land was nationalised by the Soviet Union. The drama of the land nationalisation highlights Lithuanians as an agrarian society who were fighting for their own piece of land in this Earth. The novels show the impact of the Soviet and Nazi occupation on rural people's life, on identity and patriotism of Lithuanians which lasted longer than the occupation itself.

"Sutryptų Vilčių Aimana" is the first book in the series. The novel covers the events during the German occupation of Lithuania during the World War II including the Holocaust in Lithuania. The novel was originally written in 1970, published in 1998.

"Kruvina Puota" is the second book in the series. The novel was inspired by true facts and Lithuanian partisans which Danys got to know about during his work as a rural teacher. The novel shows a reality of a guerrilla warfare that was on between civilians and the Soviet occupants in 1944-1953. The core theme of the book is a divide between youth from the same village. The novel analyses complicated interpersonal relationships between partisans, the cruelty of the Soviet occupation and the perception of communism and Lithuanian patriotism of rural people. The novel was originally written in 1970-1975, published in 1997.

"Užkasti Akmenys" is the third book in the series. The novel talks about a cruel process of taking a land away from people and establishing kolkhozes and state farms in the Soviet Lithuania. The book name means a common behaviour between people whose land was taken away: they buried stones to mark where their private land ended to express a wish to get their land and freedom back. The novel was originally written in 1977, published in 2003.

"Skaudūs Praeities Sopuliai" is the last book in the series. The novel shows life several generations after the war. It talks about the lasting impact of painful experiences on those who lived during a war time. It also shows how past political events and supporting one ideology or the other impacted the destiny of children and grandchildren. The novel was originally written in 1984-1986, published in 2001.

Other Works 
The novel "Saldaus Gyvenimo Klampynėse" is the first book written by Danys. The story is happening during the first years of the post-World War II when communism started to establish in Lithuania. The character of the book is a young charismatic man who discloses how employees of the factory were forced to steal from a workplace for survival. The core theme of the novel is an internal conflict and an attempt of young people to find a right choice for life in the new Soviet Lithuania. The novel was written in 1955, published in 2009.

The novel "Žemės Trauka" talks about conflicting worldviews between descendants from wealthy families. The core theme of the book is a connection with nature and a mother land. The novel was written in 1983-1987, published in 2004.

The novel "Rasoti Takai" talks about events during the Interwar period (1918–1938) when Lithuania was an independent country and when a land was respected and highly appreciated. The novel highlights the aspirations of people to find a meaning in life and to comprehend that after many years of oppression when the freedom is achieved people have to change their worldview and do it by themselves. The novel talks about interpersonal relationships between youth, love, selfish attempts to secure a material wealth through arranged marriage. The novel was published in 2006.

Awards
The novel "Kraujo Lašas Auskaruose" won a prize from "Lietuvos Šaulių Sąjunga" in 1993. The novel "Kelionė į Nebūtį" won the same prize from "Lietuvos Šaulių Sąjunga" in 1995.

The novel "Žemės Trauka" won fourth place in the competition run by the emigrants newspaper "Lietuvių Balsas" in 2001.

Legacy
In 2000, Danys built a cross "In the memory of Daniai family" in his native land at Trumpiškiai where it used to be a family house. In 2014, in the same location at Trumpiškiai, his grandson Žilvinas Danys has started to create a Lithuanian ethnographic architecture park with the traditional type of sculptures called "stogastulpis". The park is dedicated to a Danys and his brother doctor Jurgis Danys.

Bibliography 
 Danys, Alfonsas (1978). "Visiems Užteks": Satire. – Vilnius: Vaga."
 — (1993)."Kruvinas Akordas": Detective Fiction. – Kaunas: Europa.
 — (1993). "Kraujo Lašas Auskaruose": Detective Fiction Story. – Kaunas: Europa.
 — (1994). "Nuodų Taurė": Detective Fiction Story. – Kaunas: Europa.
 — (1995). "Kelionė į Nebūtį": Novel. – Vilnius: Žiburys.
 — (1996). "Vaišės Prieš Mirtį": Detective Fiction Story. – Vilnius: Pradai.
 — (1997). "Krypuojantis Vežimas": Satire. – Vilnius: Rotas.
 — (1997). "Kruvina Puota": Novel. – Vilnius: Horizontas.
 — (1998). "Sava Kišenė Ne Svetima": Satire Story. – Vilnius: Rotas.
 — (1998). "Sutryptų Vilčių Aimana": Novel. – Vilnius: Horizontas.
 — (1999). "Rūkytas Kumpis": Satire Novel. – Vilnius: Rotas.
 — (1999). "Šūvių Aidai Gūdumoje": Detective Fiction Story. – Vilnius: Rotas.
 — (2001). "Skaudūs Praeities Sopuliai": Novel. – Vilnius: Rotas.
 — (2003). "Užkasti Akmenys": Novel. – Vilnius: Baltijos Spaudos ir Prekybos B-vės Sp.
 — (2004). "Žemės Trauka": Novel. – Vilnius: Trys Žvaigždutės: Pasaulinės Lietuvių Vaikų Literatūros Asociacija "Lietuviška Vaikų Knyga".
 — (2005). "Jupiteris Žemėje": Novel. – Vilnius: Trys Žvaigždutės.
 — (2006). "Rasoti Takai": Novel. – Vilnius: Trys Žvaigždutės.
 — (2009). "Saldaus Gyvenimo Klampynėse": Novel. – Vilnius: Petro Ofsetas.
 — (2013). "Dvikovos Pinklėse": Novel. – Kaunas: Diremta.
 — (2014). "Brydė Rytmetyje": Novel. – Kaunas: Diremta.

References

External links

 Alfonsas Danys Electronic Library
 Alfonsas Danys Wikipedia Page in Lithuanian
 Jurgis Danys Wikipedia Page in Lithuanian

1924 births
2014 deaths
People from Rokiškis
Lithuanian male writers
Lithuanian novelists
Lithuanian University of Educational Sciences alumni